Choe Un-gyong (born 20 November 1994) is a North Korean diver. She won bronze with partner Kim Jin-ok in 3 m synchronized springboard event at the 2014 Asian Games and won silver in 1 metre springboard event at the 2017 Summer Universiade.

References

North Korean female divers
1994 births
Living people
Asian Games medalists in diving
Divers at the 2014 Asian Games
Asian Games bronze medalists for North Korea
Medalists at the 2014 Asian Games
Universiade medalists in diving
Universiade silver medalists for North Korea
Medalists at the 2017 Summer Universiade
21st-century North Korean women